Leslie Holmes (30 April 1901 – 27 December 1960) was a Canadian baritone and voice teacher. Holmes was born in Lesser Slave Lake in 1901. He was a celebrated singer in oratorios, concerts, and recitals in Canada and England from the 1920s-1950s. He appeared as a soloist with several notable music ensembles during his career, including the London Symphony Orchestra, the Montreal Orchestra, and the Toronto Symphony Orchestra. He was also a soloist at the Montreal Festivals.

Holmes studied singing at the Canadian Academy of Music with Albert Ham and at the Royal College of Music in London with Harry Plunkett Greene. He was a professor of singing at The Royal Conservatory of Music in Toronto (1946-1947, and 1954-1959) and at the Royal Academy of Music in London (1947-1954). Several of his pupils had successful careers, including James Milligan, Jan Simons, and Harry Mossfield among others.

References

1901 births
1960 deaths
Academics of the Royal Academy of Music
Alumni of the Royal College of Music
Canadian male singers
Canadian operatic baritones
Academic staff of The Royal Conservatory of Music